"Unforgettable" is a song recorded by American country music singer Thomas Rhett. It was released to country radio on July 28, 2017 via Valory Music Group as the second single from his third studio album, Life Changes (2017). The song was written by Rhett, Jesse Frasure, Ashley Gorley and Shane McAnally.

Content
Rolling Stone said that the song "examines a day at the start of a relationship from the vantage of its more mature present day." It features details about the narrator meeting his lover for the first time.

Videos
A lyric video was first released in July 2017, featuring Rhett performing in concert as well as video clips of him and his wife Lauren. A music video of a live performance at CMA Awards directed by Paul Miller premiered on CMT, GAC, and Vevo in November 2017.

Commercial performance
"Unforgettable" debuted  at No. 33 on the Billboards Country Airplay chart of August 12, 2017. The song was then released for sale, and it charted at No. 13 on the Hot Country Songs (chart date August 19, 2017), with 29,000 copies sold in the first week. The song has sold 293,000 copies in the United States as of February 2018.

Charts

Year-end charts

Certifications

References

2017 songs
2017 singles
Country ballads
2010s ballads
Thomas Rhett songs
Big Machine Records singles
Songs written by Thomas Rhett
Songs written by Jesse Frasure
Songs written by Ashley Gorley
Songs written by Shane McAnally
Song recordings produced by Dann Huff
Song recordings produced by Julian Bunetta
Pop ballads